Lejogaster is a genus of small, shiny, metallic hoverflies.

Species
L. metallina (Fabricius, 1781)
L. nigricans (Stackelberg, 1922)
L. tarsata (Meigen, 1822)

References

Diptera of Europe
Hoverfly genera
Taxa named by Camillo Rondani
Eristalinae